was a Japanese amateur and professional wrestler. He competed in the men's Greco-Roman light heavyweight at the 1964 Summer Olympics. After his competitive career, he worked in International Wrestling Enterprise, All Japan Pro Wrestling and New Japan Pro-Wrestling under the ring name of Thunder Sugiyama, later becoming an actor and tarento until his death.

Professional wrestling career

Along with teammate Masa Saito, who had competed in the freestyle tournament in 1964, they joined the Japan Pro Wrestling Alliance dojo. Sugiyama was given the nickname "Thunder", which he used in his debut on 4 March 1966, against Kazuo Honma. Later in the year, however, he joined Isao Yoshiwara and Hiro Matsuda in forming a new promotion, International Wrestling Enterprise.

Sugiyama was the second man to portray the "Tokyo Joe" character in North America after Mr. Hito and before fellow IWE wrestler Tetsunosuke Daigo, who debuted a few months after him in Tokyo Pro Wrestling.

In 1972 Sugiyama left IWE and went over to help Giant Baba form All Japan Pro Wrestling, where he competed until 1976. During 1977 he briefly returned to IWE, and in 1978 he moved to New Japan Pro-Wrestling, where he stayed as heel until 1980 when he retired.

Sugiyama died on 22 November 2002 of a heart attack.

Championships and accomplishments
International Wrestling Enterprise
IWA World Heavyweight Championship (1 time)
IWA World Tag Team Championship (2 times) - with Great Kusatsu and Rusher Kimura
TWWA World Tag Team Championship (2 times) - with Toyonobori and Rusher Kimura

Filmography

References

External links 
 
 

1940 births
2002 deaths
Japanese male sport wrestlers
Olympic wrestlers of Japan
Wrestlers at the 1964 Summer Olympics
Sportspeople from Niigata Prefecture
Japanese male professional wrestlers
20th-century Japanese people
21st-century Japanese people